This article is about the list of SC Santa Maria players.  Sport Clube Santa Maria is a Cape Verdean football (soccer) club based in Santa Maria, Cape Verde and plays at Estádio Marcelo Leitão in Espargos.  The club was formed on 1 April 1937.

List of players

Notes

References

SC Santa Maria players
Santa Maria
Association football player non-biographical articles